Vandu or Red Gelao is an endangered Gelao language spoken in two villages of Ha Giang Province, Vietnam. 1-2 speakers have also been located across the border in Malipo County, Yunnan, China.

Samarina (2011), which includes lengthy word lists and audio recordings, is the most detailed linguistic description to date.

Speakers
As the most endangered Gelao language variety, Red Gelao of Vietnam (not to be confused with A'ou of Guizhou, China, which is also referred to as Red Gelao) is spoken by only about 50 people. Many speakers have shifted to Southwestern Mandarin or Hmong. Edmondson (1998) reports that there are also Red Gelao people in Cán Tí, Quản Bạ District and Túng Sán, Hoàng Su Phì District who no longer speak any Gelao, and speak Hmong, Tay, or Vietnamese instead. Hoang (2013:12) reports that there also some Red Gelao in Vĩnh Hảo commune, Bắc Quang District who had moved from Túng Sán commune. However, the White Gelao of nearby Phố La Village and Sính Lủng Village of Dồng Văn District still speak the White Gelao language.

References

Kra languages
Languages of Vietnam